G. is the third studio album released by the hard rock band Gotthard. The album peaked at #1 on the Swiss charts and was certified as Platinum for exceeding 30,000 sales.

The original version of "Sweet Little Rock 'n' Roller" first appeared as "Sweet Little R'R'" on Chris von Rohr's 1987 solo album, Hammer & Tongue, re-issued in 1993 as The Good, The Bad and The Dog.

Track listing
All songs written by Steve Lee/Leo Leoni/Chris von Rohr except where noted.

 "Sister Moon" – 3:55
 "Make My Day" – 3:45
 "Mighty Quinn" – 3:15 (Bob Dylan)
 "Movin' On" – 3:23
 "Let It Be" – 6:17 
 "Father Is That Enough?" – 4:01 
 "Sweet Little Rock 'n' Roller" – 3:19 (Chris von Rohr / Maurer)
 "Fist In Your Face" – 3:50
 "Ride On" – 4:08
 "In the Name" – 5:25
 "Lay Down the Law" – 3:37
 "Hole In One" – 3:11
 "One Life, One Soul" – 3:59
Asian version (BMG BVCM-35016) adds the following:
 "Immigrant Song" – 3:16 (Jimmy Page / Robert Plant)
BMG Ariola 1996 (74321 43036 2) adds the following:
  "He Ain't Heavy, He's My Brother" – 4:38 (Bobby Scott / Bob Russell)

Personnel
Steve Lee – Vocals 
Leo Leoni – Guitar and Vocals
Marc Lynn – Bass guitar
Hena Habegger – Drums

Guests:
Cat Gray – Keyboards and Percussion
Sammy Sanchez – Slide Guitar
Andrew Garver – Harmonica
Jane Child – Backing Vocals

Production
Mixing – Paul Lani, Chris von Rohr and Leo Leoni

Charts

Weekly charts

Year-end charts

References

External links
Heavy Harmonies page

Gotthard (band) albums
1996 albums